Rina Matewai Ruru (5 June 1902 – 26 August 1977), known as Lena Ruru, was a notable New Zealand community leader, sportswoman, pianist and Māori welfare worker. Of Māori descent, she identified with the Te Aitanga-a-Māhaki iwi. She was born in Gisborne, East Coast, New Zealand in 1902.

References

1902 births
1977 deaths
People from Gisborne, New Zealand
New Zealand Māori musicians
New Zealand musicians
Te Aitanga-a-Māhaki people
New Zealand Māori sportspeople